La Zona is one of the forty subbarrios of Santurce, San Juan, Puerto Rico.

Demographics
In 2000, La Zona had a population of 1,280.

In 2010, La Zona had a population of 1,061 and a population density of 7,073.3 persons per square mile.

Location
La Zona is the crossover section of Santurce, straddling both south and north of Interstate PR-1 (Luis Muñoz Rivera Expressway).

Central Park (Parque Central) is located between Morocco and Hoare streets on the south end of La Zona.

See also
 
 List of communities in Puerto Rico

References

Santurce, San Juan, Puerto Rico
Municipality of San Juan